Gilberto Alejandro Durán Diaz, known to all as Alejo Durán  or "El Negro Grande" (the great black Man) (February 9, 1919 – November 15, 1989) was a Colombian vallenato music traditional composer, singer and accordionist.

Duran was born in El Paso, Cesar and for most of his life he worked as a cowboy. He is notorious for lyrically "self-flagellating" himself in his songs. In 1968 Duran gained notoriety for winning the first version of the "Vallenato Legend Festival" in the city of Valledupar and is often cited as one of the best Vallenato musicians of all times. He died in Montería, Córdoba.

Colombian musician Carlos Vives did cover versions of his songs.

Popular songs he wrote include "Altos del Rosario", "Pedazo de Acordeón," "Fidelina," and "La Cachucha Bacana".

References

1919 births
1989 deaths
Vallenato musicians
Colombian accordionists
People from Cesar Department
20th-century Colombian male singers